An ecoprovince is a biogeographic unit smaller than an ecozone that contains one or more ecoregions. According to Demarchi (1996), an ecoprovince encompasses areas of uniform climate, geological history and physiography (i.e. mountain ranges, large valleys, plateaus). Their size and broad internal uniformity make them ideal units for the implementation of natural resource policies.

See also
 Bioregion
 Ecological land classification

References

Biogeography
Ecology terminology
Ecoregions